This is a list of New Zealand Police officers killed in the line of duty. As of 2020, 33 police officers have been killed by criminal act, and about 17 have died from accidental causes, during the execution of duty. There has been one instance of multiple police deaths, when Stanley Graham gunned down four officers (and two wartime home guardsmen) attempting to apprehend him in 1941, and four double fatalities. Most of the homicides have been a result of gunshot wounds, the accidents mainly due to either drowning or vehicle (car/aircraft) accidents.

A slain officer may receive a police funeral, including an honour guard and flag-draped casket, and be officially mourned in the New Zealand House of Representatives. At least four officers have received posthumous honours—Sergeant Stewart Guthrie received the highest Commonwealth civilian decoration, the George Cross. The Lou Grant Award, created in the memory of the police sergeant who died in the 1993 Eagle helicopter mid-air collision, is awarded every second year for excellence and contributions to search and rescue.

The Memorial Wall at the Royal New Zealand Police College lists the names of fallen colleagues, whom the service commemorates annually on Police Remembrance Day. The Police Association together with the New Zealand Police introduced a Police Remembrance Day Pin in 2007, for officers to wear to honour the memory of those slain during the course of duty. The pin combines a Huia tail feather with a police chevron; the Huia bird was sacred in Māori culture, wearing of its feathers restricted to people of high status.

In addition to the human officers, 24 police dogs have died in the line of duty; notably the drowning of Enzo in 2007, Gage, a six-year-old German Shepherd, in 2010. In 2016, 4-year-old German Shepherd Gazza was shot and killed in Porirua.

Officers

Killed by criminal act
Since 1 September 1886.

Killed by accident

See also
List of Australian Federal Police killed in the line of duty
List of British police officers killed in the line of duty
List of Gardaí killed in the line of duty
List of Malaysian police officers killed in the line of duty
List of Singapore police officers killed in the line of duty
List of law enforcement officers killed in the line of duty in the United States
Additionally, :Category:Police officers killed in the line of duty lists individual articles.

Notes

References
 
 
 
 
 

 New Zealand Police memorial webpage

Police officers killed in the line of duty
  
New Zealand
Police officers killed in the line of duty